Gun Gowrmez (also Romanized as Gūn Gowrmez) is a village in Garamduz Rural District, Garamduz District, Khoda Afarin County, East Azerbaijan Province, Iran. At the 2006 census, its population was 950, in 191 families. The village is populated by the Kurdish Chalabianlu tribe.

References 

Populated places in Khoda Afarin County
Kurdish settlements in East Azerbaijan Province